Echium italicum, the Italian viper's bugloss, Lady Campbell weed, or pale bugloss, is a species of plant from the family Boraginaceae, found in the Mediterranean Basin (especially in Italy, hence the name 'italicum') and, as an introduced species in the United States (for example in the state of Maryland).

Distribution
It is also found in North Africa, western Asia, Caucasus and Europe. It has naturalised in Australia.

References

italicum
Flora of Southeastern Europe
Flora of Southwestern Europe
Plants described in 1753
Taxa named by Carl Linnaeus